Outing Riley is a 2004 comedy film about a gay man coming out to his three brothers written, directed, and starring Pete Jones. It was screened at the 2004 Chicago International Film Festival and released on video in 2007.  The movie was subsequently renamed If Dad Only Knew.

Plot
Bobby Riley (Pete Jones) is a gay man in the closet, afraid to come out to his three older brothers, even though he's over 30, makes his own money, lives on his own, and is being pressed by his more liberal sister, his boyfriend, and his lesbian beard to tell them. The death of his father and a fishing trip with his brothers provide occasions when he could tell them, but he fails. The expectations of a close-knit Irish Catholic family in Chicago are hard for him to overcome. Eventually all the family's secrets are revealed, his brothers' as well as Bobby's, and the siblings all grow closer in the process.

Cast
 Pete Jones as Bobby Riley
 Nathan Fillion as Luke Riley
 Stoney Westmoreland as Connor Riley
 Dev Kennedy as Jack Riley
 Michael McDonald as Andy
 Julie Pearl as Maggie Riley
 Bob Riley as Mr. Riley
 Wendy Snyder as Smoking Woman

References

External links
 
 

2004 films
2004 comedy films
American comedy films
American LGBT-related films
2000s English-language films
2000s American films